Miriam Karlin  (23 June 19253 June 2011) was an English actress whose career lasted for more than 60 years. She was known for her role as Paddy in The Rag Trade, a 1960s BBC and 1970s LWT sitcom, and in particular for the character's catchphrase "Everybody out!" Her trademark throughout her career was her deep, husky voice.

Early life
Born Miriam Samuels in Hampstead, North London, she was brought up in an Orthodox Jewish family; members of her extended family were among those who were later murdered at Auschwitz. She was the daughter of Céline (née Aronowitz) and Harry Samuels, a barrister, who specialised in industrial and trade union law. 

Her elder brother was Michael Samuels (1920–2010), a historical linguist responsible for the Historical Thesaurus of the Oxford English Dictionary. 

When performing in one of her first radio shows, Terry-Thomas's Top of the Town, Karlin based some of the zany characters that she invented and played on people who had appeared before the rent tribunal chaired by her father.

Career
After training at RADA, Karlin made her stage debut for the Entertainments National Service Association (ENSA) in wartime shows, and subsequently appeared in repertory theatre and cabaret. She appeared in productions of The Diary of Anne Frank, The Bad Seed, The Egg, Fiddler on the Roof, and Bus Stop, among others. 

She made her film debut in Down Among the Z Men (1952), as well as featuring in A Touch of the Sun, Room at the Top, The Millionairess, Heavens Above!, Ladies Who Do, The Small World of Sammy Lee, The Bargee, Just like a Woman, A Clockwork Orange and Mahler (by Ken Russell). In 1954, she had the part of a Martian alien in the BBC radio series Journey into Space.

In 1960, she appeared opposite Sir Laurence Olivier in the film adaptation of John Osborne's play The Entertainer. She performed in the stage version of Fiddler on the Roof at Her Majesty's Theatre, starring the Israeli actor Topol. In 1972, she appeared in the title role in Mother Courage and her Children at the Palace Theatre, Watford, in a production notable for the force of her performance, and its faithfulness to the Brechtian Verfremdungseffekt.

In television, she became known for playing the belligerent shop steward Paddy in The Rag Trade, a BBC sitcom set in a textile factory, between 1961 and 1963. Her character would take advantage of the slightest opportunity to call a strike; her trademark was blowing a whistle and shouting "Everybody out!" The show was revived by rival channel ITV in 1977. 

In 1966, she appeared as a regular team member in the Australian satirical series The Mavis Bramston Show. She also appeared in the TV film Jekyll & Hyde (1990) starring Michael Caine.

Karlin performed on stage for the Royal Shakespeare Company at Stratford-upon-Avon, the Aldwych Theatre, and the Barbican Centre. She appeared in a national tour of 84 Charing Cross Road. In 1990, she became the first woman to play the title role in Harold Pinter's The Caretaker, in a production at the Sherman Theatre, Cardiff. From 1992 to 1994, she appeared as a Jewish ghost, Yetta Feldman, in the BBC sitcom So Haunt Me, alongside Tessa Peake-Jones and George Costigan.

In 2008, at the age of 83, she appeared in Stewart Permutt's Many Roads to Paradise at the Finborough Theatre in London.

Personal life
Karlin, who never married, lived in South London. A self-proclaimed atheist, she was a lifelong campaigner for Jewish and left-wing political causes, as well as an anti-fascist activist. 

A member of the Anti-Nazi League, she was prominent in protests against Holocaust denier David Irving, and campaigned to expose the Nazi sympathies of the Austrian politician Jörg Haider. 

She was an active member of the actors' union, Equity, and was appointed an Officer of the Order of the British Empire (OBE) in 1975 for her union and welfare work. Karlin was a Distinguished Supporter of the British Humanist Association, a patron of both the Burma Campaign UK (which campaigns for democracy and human rights in Burma) and Dignity in Dying (which campaigns for changes to laws on assisted dying) and a trustee of the Eddie Surman Trust (an HIV charity).
    
She admitted to a lifelong battle with anorexia and bulimia that began in 1956 and lasted over 48 years. She often claimed that her peripheral neuropathy was a side effect of a chronic eating disorder and years of laxative and appetite suppressant abuse.

Death
In 2006, while filming an Agatha Christie TV mystery, By the Pricking of My Thumbs, Karlin was told that she had cancer and that part of her tongue would have to be removed. She died on 3 June 2011.

Filmography

Works
  (Autobiography)

References

External links

The Miriam Karlin Archive is held at the University of Bristol Theatre Collection.

1925 births
2011 deaths
20th-century British actresses
21st-century English actresses
Actresses from London
Alumni of RADA
Deaths from cancer in England
English anti-fascists
English atheists
English democracy activists
English film actresses
English human rights activists
Women human rights activists
English humanists
English Ashkenazi Jews
English radio actresses
English stage actresses
English television actresses
Trade unionists from London
HIV/AIDS activists
Jewish English actresses
Jewish atheists
Jewish human rights activists
Jewish humanists
Officers of the Order of the British Empire
People from Hampstead
People from London
Royal Shakespeare Company members
Women trade unionists